Margarita Tutulani (1925 – 6 July, 1943) was an anti-fascist and hero of Albania during World War II. Her brutal death inspired many to join the resistance against fascism in Albania.

Biography 
Tutulani was born in Berat, to a family the Gorica neighborhood. Her grandfather, Dhimiter Tutulani, was a notable lawyer and one of the signers of the Albanian Declaration of Independence in 1912 and her father was a member of the Albanian Parliament. She attended the Queen Mother Pedagogical Institute in Tirana.

When Italy invaded Albania in April 1939, Tutulani moved back to Berat, where she and her family protested and demonstrated against Italian rule of their country. In 1942, she joined the Communist Party. She was also a leading figure in the November 28, 1942 demonstration in Berat, which was an anti-fascist protest that drew thousands of people. After November, she was wanted by the fascist government.

Tutulani and her brother, Kristaq Tutulani, were eventually arrested in Berat on July 4, 1943. After their arrest, they were then subjected to torture while in prison. They were later moved out of the prison and shot in Gosa, near Kavaja, on July 6, 1943.

The city of Berat was shocked at the death of both brother and sister. A "photo of her mangled body" circulated and eventually the brutality of her death inspired people to join the resistance against the fascist government.

A statue of Tutulani is at the National Martyrs Cemetery of Albania. Tutulani left behind writing which is now part of the Tutulani family archives, which included poetry, memoirs and essays. The Albanian linguist Vehxhi Buharaja wrote a poem in her honor, "Margarita," ten days after she was killed.

See also
Liri Gerro

References 

1925 births
1943 deaths
People from Berat
20th-century Albanian women politicians
Albanian resistance members
Female resistance members of World War II
Albanian communists
Executed Albanian people
People executed by Italy by firearm
Heroes of Albania
Albanian people of Aromanian descent
Albanian torture victims